Any Road Up is the debut studio album by The Steve Gibbons Band. The band were under The Who's management stable and recording this album was released by Polydor in 1976. This was followed by a tour with The Who in the UK, Europe and the United States. Playing the concert arenas, they shared the stage with Little Feat, Lynyrd Skynyrd, Electric Light Orchestra, The J. Geils Band and Nils Lofgren.

The album failed to chart while the song "Johnny Cool" (Based on the film of the same name) charted in The Billboard Hot 100 reaching and stalling at #72.

Track listing
All tracks composed by Steve Gibbons

1993 Reissue Tracks

1997 Reissue Tracks

Personnel
The Steve Gibbons Band
 Steve Gibbons - guitar, lead vocals
 Trevor Burton - bass guitar, lead guitar, vocals 
 Dave Carroll - lead guitar, vocals 
 Bob Lamb - drums  
 Bob Wilson - lead guitar, keyboards, vocals
with:
 John Entwistle - bass guitar, backing vocals
Technical
Anton Matthews - associate producer, Advison Studios
Ken Laguna - remixing, Advision Studios; additional instrumentation
John Entwistle - mixing, Ramport Studios
Terry O'Neill - photography

References

External links
 1976 track listing on Discogs.com
 1993 track listing on Discogs.com

1975 debut albums
Polydor Records albums